The Battle of Amarah took place from October 19 to October 20, 2006, between the Mahdi Army and police, who were largely members of the Badr Organization.

Background
The city of Amarah was said to have been relatively peaceful during the war, though two competing militia, the Badr Organization, and Mahdi Army existed in it. At the start of the war, there was considerable fighting amongst rival factions, and towards the end, British forces had daily contact with OMS militia - their base to the south of the city being regularly targeted by harassing but largely ineffectual mortar and rocket fire.  British forces left Amarah in August 2006 and the Iraqi government resumed control of the town. In mid October, a roadside bomb killed the Police Chief of Amarah, who belonged to the Badr Organization. In response to this, the police captured a brother of the suspected bomber, who was a member of the Mahdi Army.

Fighting
Fighting began on October 19, when 800 masked members of the Mahdi army stormed three police stations in Amarah. Several firefights occurred between the militia and police over a course of the two days. At the height of the fighting, AP Television News video showed thick, black smoke billowing from behind barricades at a police station, much of it from vehicles set on fire inside the compound. By the end of the day the Mahdi Army had full control of Amarah. Militiamen were patrolling the streets in captured police cars and maintaining order throughout the city. The militiamen withdrew the next day from their positions and lifted their siege under a truce brokered by an al-Sadr envoy as the Iraqi forces entered the city.

The timing of the violence may have indicated al-Sadr and other Mahdi Army commanders did not have full control over individual units, lending weight to speculation that Shiite gunmen were splitting off from the main organization to pursue their own agendas. A few days later there was reported fighting in the town of Suwayra, again between Iraqi security forces and Mahdi Army militiamen.

See also
Operation Black Eagle
Operation Lion's Leap

References

Battles of the Iraq War in 2006
Battles of the Iraq War involving Iraq
Amarah
October 2006 events in Iraq